Leptolalax fritinniens is a species of frog in the family Megophryidae.

References

fritinniens
Amphibians described in 2013